

Coaching and squad
 

The squad for the 2023 Super Rugby Pacific season is:

Season fixture

Statistics
(As of round three; 10 March 2023)

Notes

References

External links
 Waratahs Official website
 Australia Super Rugby website
 SANZAR website

2023
2023 in Australian rugby union